M. Ramakrishna, known professionally as Shatru, is an Indian actor who appears and works predominantly in Telugu and Tamil films. He is best known for his roles in the films Krishna Gaadi Veera Prema Gaadha (2016), Rangasthalam (2018), Kadaikutty Singam (2018), and Pushpa: The Rise (2021).

Early life and career 
Ramakrishna was born into a Telugu-speaking family to M. Satyanarayana and M. Sarojini Devi in the Sarla village of the Bargarh district in Odisha. He completed a Bachelor's degree in microbiology from Ravenshaw University. Ramakrishna later moved to Hyderabad to pursue his acting career. After starring in several films, including Leader (2010) in brief roles, Shatru had a  breakthrough for his portrayal of Ramaraju in Krishna Gaadi Veera Prema Gaadha (2016). Shatru debuted in Tamil films with Kathakali (2016) before starring in Kadaikutty Singam (2018) where he played the antagonist. In a review of the film by the Deccan Chronicle, the reviewer wrote that "Telugu actor Shatru plays the villain and is suited for the role".

Filmography

Telugu films

Tamil films

Kannada films

Television

References

External links 

Living people
Indian male film actors
Male actors in Telugu cinema
Male actors from Odisha
People from Bargarh district
21st-century Indian male actors
Telugu male actors
Male actors in Tamil cinema
Male actors in Kannada cinema
1984 births